Lake Kaindy (Qaiyñdy kölı, meaning the  "birch tree lake" or landslide) is a  lake located in Kazakhstan.

History

Lake Kaindy is located in the south of Kazakhstan, within Kolsay Lakes National Park. The lake was formed as the result of a major limestone landslide triggered by the 1911 Kebin earthquake forming a natural dam. It blocked the gorge and was filled by mountain river water. Lake Kaindy is about 400 meters long, reaching depths of nearly 30 meters at its deepest point. Altered by limestone deposits, the water maintains a bluish-green color.

The lake contains trunks of submerged Picea schrenkiana trees that rise above the surface of the lake. The area is often referred to as a "sunken forest". The cold water helps preserve the tree trunks, which are overgrown with algae and various other water plants. In recent years, Lake Kaindy has become a popular international tourist destination. The lake is also known for ice diving and trout fishing in the winter season.

The uniqueness of the lake lies in the fact that after the emergence of a natural dam that blocked the gorge, the water that filled the dam formed the lake and did not destroy the spruce trees growing in this place along the river. (The Kaindy river flows into the lake, passing through a two-sided rock face about 20 meters high). The upper part of the trees protruding from the water lost their side branches and bark, and the wood turned white. When you look at such a panorama, you get the feeling that you are looking at a submerged squadron: the bare trunks of trees resemble the masts of submerged ships. The lake surface itself changes color regularly and is often a very beautiful blue color. This strange color is caused by lime and other minerals that were in the water a hundred years ago. But as soon as you get closer to the lake, the water becomes crystal clear, and sometimes you can even see trout in it. Despite the low water temperature, Kaindy lake is popular with diving enthusiasts.

References

Lakes of Kazakhstan
Landslide-dammed lakes